LaserJet as a brand name identifies the line of laser printers marketed by the American computer company Hewlett-Packard (HP). The HP LaserJet was the world’s first desktop laser printer. Canon supplies both mechanisms and cartridges for most HP laser printers; some larger A3 models use Samsung print engines.

Although laser printers date back to the early 1970s, the first one, Xerox's model 1200, was not a desktop unit. The technology base was Xerox's photocopiers. Hewlett-Packard was first with
a desktop unit.

These printers (and later on all-in-one units, including scanning and faxing) have, as of 2020, a three decade plus history of serving both in offices and at home for personal/at home use.

In 2013, Advertising Age reported that HP had "78 different printers with 6 different model names."

Technology

Most HP LaserJet printers employ xerographic laser-marking engines sourced from the Japanese company Canon. Due to a very tight turnaround schedule on the first HP LaserJet, HP elected to use the controller already developed by Canon for the CX engine in the first HP LaserJet. In spring of 1989 The New York Times said that HP "dominates" the PC laser printer market.

The first HP LaserJet and the first Apple LaserWriter used the same print engine, the Canon CX engine. HP chose to use their in-house developed Printer Command Language (PCL) as opposed to Apple, which adopted the PostScript language, as developed by Adobe Systems.  The use of a less-ambitious and simpler Page description language allowed HP to deliver its LaserJet to the market about a year before Apple's CX based product, and for $1000 less. The sharing of an identical Canon engine in two competing products continued with the HP LaserJet II/III and the Apple LaserWriter II, which both used the Canon LBP-SX print engine.

History

1980s

HP introduced the first laser printer for IBM PC compatible personal computers in May 1984 at the Computer Dealers' Exhibition (COMDEX). It was a 300-dpi, 8 ppm printer that sold for $3,495 with the price reduced to  $2,995 in September 1985. It used an 8 MHz Motorola 68000 processor and could print in a variety of character fonts. It was controlled using PCL3.  Due to the high cost of memory, the first LaserJet only had 128 kilobytes of memory, and a portion of that was reserved for use by the controller.

The HP LaserJet printer had high print quality, could print horizontally or vertically and produce graphics. It was ideal for printing memos, letters, and spreadsheets. It was quiet compared to other contemporary printers, hence people could use the telephone while sitting near the HP LaserJet.

The first LaserJet was a high-speed replacement for text-only daisy wheel impact printers and the noisy dot matrix printers. By using control codes it was possible to change the printed text style using font patterns stored in permanent ROM in the printer.  Although unsupported by HP, because the Laserjet used the same basic PCL language (PCL Level III) spoken by HP's other printers it was possible to use the Laserjet on HP 3000 multiuser systems.

The LaserJet Plus followed in September 1985, priced at US$3,995. It introduced "soft fonts", treatments like bold and italic and other features including a parallel (Centronics) interface. It also included 512 kilobytes of memory, which was sufficient to print graphics at 300 dpi that covered about 70% of the letter-size page area.

 In March 1986 HP introduced the LaserJet D+, which included the LaserJet print engine and formatter but with two paper trays. The original MSRP was $4,495. In 1986, desktop publishing came to the world of IBM PCs and compatibles, after its origin on the Apple Macintosh and Apple LaserWriter. The HP LaserJet family, along with Aldus PageMaker and Microsoft Windows, was central to the PC-based solution and while the design was more plebeian than Apple's product, this multi-vendor solution was available to a mass audience for the first time.
 HP introduced the mass-market laser printer, the LaserJet series II, in March 1987. The HP LaserJet II was designed as a laser printer with correct order page output as opposed to being leveraged from the Canon PC-20 personal copier. The HP LaserJet II used PCL4, improved features, more memory and fonts for a market price of $2,695.
 Also in March 1987, the LaserJet 2000 was launched. A high-end, networkable printer, the LaserJet 2000 offered a duty cycle of 70,000 pages per month and the standard 300-dpi output, initially priced at $19,995.

The HP LaserJet IID was released in the fall of 1988, It was the first desktop laser printer capable of duplexing. It was also the first HP LaserJet with an HP-designed and manufactured formatter.

In September 1989, HP introduced the first "personal" version of the HP LaserJet printer series, the LaserJet IIP. Priced at US$1,495 by HP, and half the size and price of its predecessor, the LaserJet II, it offered 300-dpi output and 4 ppm printing with PCL 4 enhancements such as support for compressed bitmapped fonts and raster images. It was also the first no ozone print engine.  Retailers predicted a street price of $1000 or less, making it the world’s first sub-$1,000 laser printer. The LaserJet IIP (and its very similar successor, the IIIP) were reliable.

Aftermarket replacement scanner assemblies remain available today.

1990s

In March 1990 HP introduced the LaserJet III, priced at US$2,395, with two new features: Resolution Enhancement technology (REt), which dramatically increased print quality, and HP PCL 5. Thanks to PCL 5, text scaling became easy, and thus customers were no longer restricted to 10- and 12-point type sizes. This had a dramatic effect on word processing software market.

The HP LaserJet IIID was the same as the HP LaserJet III except it had 2 paper trays and duplex printing. It sold for $4,995 in the fall of 1990.

The first mass-market Ethernet network printer, the HP LaserJet IIISi, debuted in March 1991. Priced at $5,495, it featured a high-speed, 17 ppm engine, 5MB of memory, 300-dpi output, Image REt and such paper handling features as job stacking and optional duplex printing. The LaserJet IIISi also was HP’s first printer to offer onboard Adobe PostScript emulation as opposed to the font-cartridge solution offered on earlier models.

In October 1992, HP introduced the LaserJet 4 featuring a Canon EX engine with native 600-dpi output and Microfine toner for US$2,199. This model also introduced TrueType fonts to LaserJets which ensured that the printer fonts exactly matched the fonts displayed on the computer screen.  (TrueType fonts could print on an original LaserJet Plus or later, but they would be printed as graphics, making the printing slow and restricted to a limited page area or reduced resolution.) Some competitors also utilized the Canon EX engine, including Apple (LaserWriter Pro 600 and 630), Digital Equipment Corporation (DEClaser 5100), and Canon.

In 2020 The New York Times wrote "by the 1990s, it was a staple of offices around the world." The flagship of the family was the HP LaserJet 4 SiMX, launched in May 1993. It had several network interfaces by default, both Ethernet, Appletalk and TokenRing. Instant-on fusing was introduced with the HP LaserJet 4L in the spring of 1993. It included a new low cost print engine. It sold for $1,229.

 In April 1994 HP shipped its 10-millionth LaserJet printer.
 In September 1994 HP introduced the Color LaserJet, the corporation's first color laser printer. The printer had an average cost per page of less than 10 cents. The Color LaserJet offered 2 ppm color printing and 10 ppm for black text, 8MB of memory, 45 built-in fonts, a 1,250-sheet paper tray and enhanced PCL 5 with color. It was priced at $7,295.
 In March 1995 HP introduced the LaserJet 5 family of printers. They supported HP PCL 6, a printer-language which gave noticeably faster output – especially with complex, graphics-intensive documents. They also featured 600-dpi output with REt, and a 12 ppm engine. Prices started from $1,629. The models were updated next year.

The Color LaserJet 5 and 5M were introduced in March 1996, with 1200 dpi resolution. The LaserJet 6P and 6MP were introduced October 1996. They included infrared technology, for wireless printing.

In November 1996 HP introduced the network-ready LaserJet 5Si, a major revision and upgrade to the 3Si (IIISi) and 4Si, which had used the Canon NX engine.  The 5Si, based on the Canon WX engine, could thus provide 11"x17" printing at an unprecedented 24 pages per minute and at 600 dpi with resolution enhancement.  An internal duplexer enabled full-speed double-sided printing.  Automatic personality switching (between PCL and PostScript), a feature that first appeared on the 4SiMX, was standard on the 5SiMX.  The 5Si series were true workhorses, but initial production models were somewhat hobbled by a vulnerability to slightly low voltage (i.e. crashing if mains voltage was less than 120 Volts) as well as a weak clutch in Tray 3 (thus resulting in paper jamming for Tray 3 as well as the optional 2,000-sheet Tray 4), and also a weak solenoid in the manual feed tray (Tray 1).  These paper-handling issues were easily dealt with, and many 5Si LaserJets remain in service today.  The HP 5Si Mopier, a 5Si equipped with all available options, was marketed as the first network printer that was optimized to produce multiple original prints (mopies). It had a 100,000 copies-per-month duty cycle, and 24 ppm print speed.
 
In 1997, HP introduced the HP LaserJet 4000 family of printers. They included features from the HP LaserJet 5 plus higher resolution of 1200 dpi.  These are mostly used in offices, and most recently in people's homes mainly to replace the HP LaserJet 4/5 series if the user had them previously. In 1999, HP released the HP LaserJet 4050 series, which was identical to the HP 4000 but with a faster formatter and an easily accessible paper registration area (where the paper is stopped, registered, and then advanced for printing; a flip-up cover here made clearing of this component easier.)  The 4000 series, as well as the 4050 and the 4100, used partly external duplexers.

The world’s first mass market all-in-one laser device, the HP LaserJet 4101 MFP, debuted in April 1998. Users could print, fax, copy, and scan with a single appliance. In July 1998 HP shipped its 30-millionth LaserJet printer.

In February 1999, HP introduced the LaserJet 2100 printer series 
– the world’s first personal laser printers in their class to offer high-quality 1200x1200-dpi resolution without significant performance loss.

In the network laser-printer market, the 5Si series was succeeded by the 8000, and later by the 8100 and 8150.  The 8000 brought 1200x1200-dpi resolution, which was continued in the 8100 and 8150.  The 8100 and 8150 brought faster printing (32 pages per minute), but this speed was only realized for single-sided (simplex) printing; double-sided printing remained at 24 pages per minute.  These models, which used the Canon WX engine, provided excellent durability and good maintainability.

2000s

In December 2000 HP shipped its 50-millionth LaserJet printer.

In September 2001 HP entered the low-end laser printer market with the introduction of the LaserJet 1000: the first sub-$250 LaserJet and the lowest-priced monochrome (black and white) HP LaserJet printer to date. It offered 10 ppm, an HP Instant-on fuser, 600 dpi with HP REt boosting output effectively to 1200 dpi, a 2.5-cent cost per page, and a 7,000-page monthly duty cycle.

In 2002, the 8150 was discontinued and was replaced by the 9000 series, which produced 50 pages per minute and used an internal duplexer. Meanwhile, the 4100 was replaced by the 4200 (later 4250) and 4300 (later 4350), which brought speeds of up to 55 pages per minute. In 2003 HP shipped its 75-millionth LaserJet printer.
 
In November 2003, HP entered the $24-billion copier market with the LaserJet 9055/9065/9085 MFPs(multifunction printers), a copier-based line of high-volume multifunction printers.

In 2006, total HP LaserJet sales had reached 100 million.

 HP has several lines of monochrome and color printers and multifunction products (copy, scan, and/or fax included) that range from 20–55 ppm and range in price from $149 to several thousand dollars.

Evolution of control panel

The 1992 LaserJet 4L marked the transition between a control panel evolved for an informed operator and one evolved for a casual user. The 4L's predecessor, the IIIP, had an array of buttons and a cryptic numerical LCD. The 4L shipped with 4 LEDs, each with an icon to indicate a different condition, and a single pushbutton whose purpose varied depending on context (i.e. Hold down during printing, the printer will cancel the job. Hold down when off, the printer will power up and print a test page including total number of pages printed. A short press would provide a form feed or tell the printer to resume from a paper jam or out-of-paper condition. The actual application of the button was supposed to be far more intuitive than any possible written description – basically, the button tells the printer "whatever you're doing now, do the next most logical thing"). This interface was supposed to be easier for new and casual users to understand and use, but it was also much less powerful, as in any case there is only one thing a user can make the printer do. Until the user becomes familiar with the printer's behavior, they have to guess what that one thing is, or else consult the manual.

A 4L's four status LEDs will also light in unusual patterns to indicate service requirements; for example, a lit error light and a lit ready light would indicate a fuser problem (usually just needs to be reseated – most 4L problems can be resolved by simply disassembling the printer, cleaning it, then reassembling it).  This was much more cryptic than the alphanumeric display of earlier models like the II/IID III/IIID, IIP, and IIIP, as it was impossible to determine the meaning of the patterns of LEDs without comparing them against a manual (or having their meaning memorized, which some technicians exposed to them often might actually do, intentionally or not).  The 4L used early light pipes, with surface-mounted LEDs on the control board on the left side of the printer, and plastic channels to conduct light from the lit status LEDs to the top of the printer. The LaserJet 4/4 Plus/4M/4M Plus retained an alphanumeric display, and in fact upgraded from the LCD displays of earlier models by using a 16-character alphanumeric dot-matrix vacuum fluorescent display.  To this day, professional-grade LaserJets retain more comprehensive displays.

Before the 4L, the control panel typically had buttons with names like Online, Menu, Shift, Continue, Reset, +, -, and Form Feed.  It also included status indicators like Online and Ready.  Users without a technical background, especially those who had not used a printer before the late 1990s, might not understand these indicators, or might think they are conflicting or ambiguous.  It may not be intuitive to new users that a printer that is ready but offline does not print, and while being able to take the printer off line (effectively disconnecting it from the computer) without shutting it down can be very useful, this distinction may appear as an extra complication to users who want to casually use the printer merely as an information appliance.

When a Windows PC controls a LaserJet, the "Form Feed" button seldom does anything when pressed. It has a small indicator light, and was usually used with very simple DOS programs that did not eject the last page after sending data to the printer, though it could also be useful to print the data in the printer's memory if a program failed in the middle of sending a page to be printed. (In certain cases, this might be the only way to recover one's data in the event of a system crash that occurred while printing.)  The Form Feed button would print whatever was remaining in memory and prepare the printer to accept any new data as the start of a new page.  Note that for at least some LaserJet models, notably the LaserJet 4[M][Plus], the printer must be switched off-line before the Form Feed button will work.  Most users of dot-matrix printers in the 1980s probably found the Online and Form Feed functions obvious, as most dot-matrix printers had these buttons and they worked similarly.  The indicator on the Form Feed button illuminates when there is received data in the printer's buffer; this makes it much easier to predict what will happen if the printer is put online and a new job is sent to it, or if sending of a job in progress is resumed.

Also, the "Online" button is actually a toggle switch, such that if the printer is already online, pressing Online makes the printer go offline and can be used to stop a runaway print job. Pressing Shift-Reset will then reset the printer, clearing the remainder of the unwanted document from the printer's memory, so that it will not continue to print it when brought back on line.  (Before resetting the printer, it is necessary to make the computer stop sending data for the print job to the printer, if it hasn't already finished sending that job, through the computer's software.  Otherwise, when the printer is put back online, it will start receiving the job from somewhere in the middle, which will likely cause the same runaway problem to recur.)

But by 1999 personal computers had embraced the Windows 95 era and many of the original manual control buttons like Form Feed were no longer necessary, because the Windows 95 print-spooler subsystem offered even simple Windows applications a much greater control over the printer than was available to DOS applications, which had to each independently rebuild and re-engineer basic printer management systems from scratch. This new Windows-oriented interface was highly intuitive and obvious to the casual user, who needed little familiarization with the printer to use it effectively.

Raw, unformatted, text-only support still exists, but the professional LaserJet printers keep it hidden away. Most professional LaserJet printers include a PCL menu where the number of copies, the font style, portrait or landscape printing, and the number of lines-per-page can be defined. These settings are ignored by graphical PCL/Postscript print drivers, and are only used for those rare situations where a LaserJet is used to emulate a lineprinter.

With the advent of the HP LaserJet 4000 in 1997, the control panel was completely redesigned. The Shift button,  which might have been confusing, was gone. There was a Menu, an Item and a Value button. Each of these might be clicked left or right. There was a Select button, a large green Go button, and a small orange Cancel Job button. Configuration through the control panel was easier and more intuitive: menus could be navigated with the Menu button. Then, items within the menu selected with the Item button. The Value button – which had - (decrease) and + (increase) indications – could be used to select a specific setting or value. The Select button was used to select or confirm a particular choice. The display was adapted to a blue-backlit two-line LCD display.

Newer models such as the LaserJet 600 series now include a full color LCD display. Two directional arrow buttons and a Ok button replace the multiple menu navigation buttons of the 4000 series. A numeric keypad and other specialized buttons are also included for job storage, copy, and fax usage on models with those features.

Key innovations
 
 Spring 1984 – First HP LaserJet
 Autumn 1991 – First HP Color LaserJet
 Spring 1997 – First printer-based multifunction device
 Spring 2006 – World’s smallest-footprint LaserJet
 Summer 2011 – HP Extraordinary Colors
 Spring 2015 – JetIntelligence

Industry firsts
 
 Spring 1984 – Personal laser printing
 March 1991 – Ethernet network printing
 April 1993 – Web Jetadmin
 November 2005 – Universal Print Driver

Models
The model numbers do not necessarily have anything to do with the order of product development or the type of print-engine technology. For example, the LaserJet 1018 printer has newer, smaller, and more energy-efficient technology than the LaserJet 4000. The 1018 also features USB while the older 4000 does not.

Mono

 HP LaserJet Original Printer series
 HP LaserJet Printer (March 1984)
 HP LaserJet Plus Printer (November 1985)
 HP LaserJet 500 Plus Printer (March 1986)
 HP LaserJet II Printer series (March 1987)
 HP LaserJet Series II Printer
 HP LaserJet IID Printer (1988)
 HP LaserJet IIp Printer (1989)
 HP LaserJet IIp Plus Printer (1989)
 HP LaserJet III Printer series (March 1990)
 HP LaserJet III Printer (1990)
 HP LaserJet IIID Printer (1990)
 HP LaserJet IIIp Printer (1991)
 HP LaserJet IIISi Printer (March 1991)
 HP LaserJet 4 Printer series
 HP LaserJet 4 (October 1992) / 4M Printer series
 HP LaserJet 4 Plus / 4M Plus Printer series
 HP LaserJet 4L / mL Printer series
 HP LaserJet 4p / mp Printer series
 HP LaserJet 4Si Printer series
 HP LaserJet 4v / mv Printer series (1994)
 HP LaserJet 5 Printer series
 HP LaserJet 5 / m / n Printer series
 HP LaserJet 5 (April 1996)
 HP LaserJet 5L Printer series
 HP LaserJet 5p / mp Printer series
 HP LaserJet 5Si Printer series
 HP LaserJet 6 Printer series
 HP LaserJet 6L Printer series
 HP LaserJet 6L Pro Printer
 HP LaserJet 6P/MP Printer series
 HP LaserJet 1000 Printer series
 HP LaserJet 1000 Printer (2001)
 HP LaserJet 1005 Printer
 HP LaserJet 1010 Printer series
 HP LaserJet 1012 Printer
 HP LaserJet 1015 Printer
 HP LaserJet 1018 Printer
 HP LaserJet 1020 Printer series
 HP LaserJet 1022 Printer series
 HP LaserJet 1100 Printer series
 HP LaserJet 1150 Printer
 HP LaserJet 1160 Printer Series
 HP LaserJet 1200 Printer series
 HP LaserJet 1300 Printer series
 HP LaserJet 1320 Printer series
 HP LaserJet 2000 Printer series (March 1987)
 HP LaserJet 2000 Printer series
 HP LaserJet 2100 Printer series (February 1999) 
 HP LaserJet 2200 Printer series (2001)
 HP LaserJet 2300 Printer series
 HP LaserJet 2400 Printer series
 HP LaserJet 4000 Printer series (1997)
 HP LaserJet 4000 Printer series (1997)
 HP LaserJet 4050 Printer series (1999)
 HP LaserJet 4100 Printer series (2001)
 HP LaserJet 4200 Printer series (2002)
 HP LaserJet 4240n Printer
 HP LaserJet 4250 Printer series
 HP LaserJet 4300 Printer series
 HP LaserJet 4350 Printer series
 HP LaserJet 5000 Printer series
 HP LaserJet 5000 Printer series
 HP LaserJet 5100 Printer series
 HP LaserJet 5200 Printer series (2006)
 HP LaserJet 8000 Printer series (1998)
 HP LaserJet 8000 Printer series
 HP LaserJet 8100 Printer series
 HP LaserJet 8150 Printer series (2004)
 HP LaserJet 9000 Printer series (2002)
 HP LaserJet 9000 Printer series
 HP LaserJet 9040 Printer series
 HP LaserJet 9050 Printer series
 HP LaserJet P1005 series
 HP LaserJet P1005
 HP LaserJet P1500 Printer series
 HP LaserJet P1505n Printer series
 HP LaserJet P2001 Printer series
 HP LaserJet P2015 Printer series
 HP LaserJet P3000 Printer series (2006)
 HP LaserJet Enterprise P3010 series (2009)
 HP LaserJet P4010 Printer series (P4014, P4015, P4515)
 HP LaserJet P4500 Printer series
 HP LaserJet P2035 (November 2013)
 HP LaserJet M201dw Printer series (2015)
 HP LaserJet M203dw Printer series (2016)
 HP LaserJet M400 Printer series 
 HP LaserJet M401 Printers (2012)
 HP LaserJet M402 / M403 Printers (2015)
 HP LaserJet M500 Printer series  (M501, M506, M507)
 HP LaserJet M600 Printer series (M601, M602, M603, M604, M605, M606, M607, M608, M609, M610, M611, M612)
 HP LaserJet M130 Printer series
 HP LaserJet 3001, 4001, 4101 MFP (2022)
 HP LaserJet Companion The LaserJet Companion is a sheet-fed monochrome scanner that connected to the parallel port of a LaserJet and provided copy functionality; as well as software scanning and fax functions.

Color
 
 HP Color LaserJet Original Printer series
 HP Color LaserJet (September 1994)
 HP Color LaserJet CP4000 Printer series
 HP Color LaserJet CP4005 Printer series
 HP Color LaserJet 5 Printer series
 HP Color LaserJet 5/5m Printer series
 HP Color LaserJet 1000 Printer series
 HP Color LaserJet 1500 Printer series
 HP Color LaserJet 1600 Printer
 HP Color LaserJet 2000 Printer series
 HP Color LaserJet 2500 Printer series
 HP Color LaserJet 2550 Printer series
 HP Color LaserJet 2600n Printer
 HP Color LaserJet 2605 Printer series
 HP Color LaserJet 2700 Printer series
 HP Color LaserJet 3000 Printer series
 HP Color LaserJet 3000 Printer series
 HP Color LaserJet 3500 Printer series
 HP Color LaserJet 3550 Printer series
 HP Color LaserJet 3600 Printer series (2004)
 HP Color LaserJet 3700 Printer series
 HP Color LaserJet 3800 Printer series
 HP Color LaserJet 4000 Printer series
 HP Color LaserJet 4500 Printer series (1998)
 HP Color LaserJet 4550 Printer series
 HP Color LaserJet 4600 Printer series
 HP Color LaserJet 4610n Printer
 HP Color LaserJet 4650 Printer series
 HP Color LaserJet 4700 Printer series
 HP Color LaserJet 5000 Printer series
 HP Color LaserJet 5500 Printer series
 HP Color LaserJet 5550 Printer series
 HP Color LaserJet 8000 Printer series
 HP Color LaserJet 8500 Printer series
 HP Color LaserJet 8550 Printer series
 HP Color LaserJet 9000 Printer series
 HP Color LaserJet 9500 Printer series
 HP LaserJet M252 Printer series
 HP LaserJet M452 Printer series
 HP Color LaserJet M177 Printer series
 HP Color LaserJet M277 Printer series
 HP Color LaserJet M477 Printer series
(Source: HP.com)

Model suffixes
Printers with factory-installed options have different model-numbers to denote the different options included and to differentiate a specific model from others in its series. These suffixes include:

 D  for a duplexer, enabling automatic double-sided printing.
 T for an additional paper-tray (enables two different paper types to be kept available, or in certain models, to load paper while the printer is printing).  (Some D models, with no T suffix, had two trays built in, as did the LaserJet 500 Plus.)
 S for a Paper Stacker, a device which increases the output bin capacity.
 N for built-in, MIO or EIO slot JetDirect (network) card and usually also PostScript
 W for built-in wireless network card
 F for fax capability (multifunction units only)
 H for High-capacity (heavy-duty model, sometimes combined with M to indicate Heavy Media) or HP High-Performance Secure Hard Disk
 L for Light (only 1 paper tray)
 P for Personal, meant for "personal or small workgroup" use 
 ph+ for Paper handling (e.g. Stapler-stacker), or S/SL for stapler/stacker.
 M for Macintosh (PostScript module and Mini DIN-8 serial port present); also extra memory to support PostScript (as in 4M/4M Plus)
 V for 11-inch wide paper path, to support 8.5x11R and 11"x17" paper. (as in 4MV)
 X for combination duplexing, networkable printer with additional tray.  Replaced the DTN suffix.
Example: A LaserJet 4000X would come with a duplexer and a built in JetDirect card, as well as an extra paper tray.
 E previously stood for HP ePrint, now it stands for HP+ enabled models that require an internet connection and the HP Smart device app to work.

Upgrading memory of older models

Many older LaserJets and other HP printers (including LaserJet 4+, 4MV, 4MP, 4P, 5, 5M, 5MP, 5N, 5P, 5se, 5Si MOPIER, 5Si, 5Si NX, 6MP, 6P, 6Pse, 6Pxi, C3100A; DesignJet 330, 350C, 700, 750C, 750C Plus; DeskJet: 1600C, 1600CM, 1600CN; and PaintJet XL300) used proprietary 72-pin HP SIMMs for memory expansion. These are essentially industry-standard 72-bit SIMMs with non-standard Presence Detect (PD) connections. One can often adapt a standard 72-pin SIMM of appropriate capacity to support HP PD by soldering wires to pads, a simple task. HP printers of this type specify that RAM not faster than 70ns be used; this is probably due to a limitation of the PD decoding, and faster RAM can actually be used so long as the PD encoding indicates a speed of 70ns or slower. All printers will work with FPM (Fast Page Mode) memory; many, but not all, will work with EDO (Extended Data Out) memory.

Some even older models, such as the LaserJet II, IID, III, IIID, and 4/4M (i.e. not 4 Plus/4M Plus), used proprietary memory expansion boards. For example, the II and IID models used a roughly 4" square memory expansion board populated with DIP DRAM chips and a two-row header connector (with pins on standard 0.1" centers), while the 4/4M used 72 pin parity memory (and would fail to POST with non-parity memory). For the 4/4M (and the 4 Plus/4M Plus) memory modules of 4, 8, 16 and 32 MB were available.

Vulnerabilities
In November 2011, researchers at Columbia University announced the discovery of widespread vulnerabilities in HP LaserJet printers that allowed malicious firmware to be uploaded to the printers remotely. Using weaknesses in the printers' Web-based control interface, attackers could traverse the directory tree of an unpatched computer's data storage, and then locate cached copies of otherwise restricted information, moments before or even after it has been printed. This information can then be forwarded to hackers for accumulation to facilitate harmful actions.

The malicious firmware could also be crafted to exfiltrate printout data over the network, to attack other computers on the network, or even to cause a printer to intentionally overheat. Security update patches were strongly urged by HP. As of late 2011, Computerworld stated that "Millions of HP LaserJet printers" still had "a security weakness that could allow attackers to take control of" their hardware.

In September 2015, HP added new features to its printers to address security vulnerabilities, releasing what they called the "World's Most Secure Printers".

Repairs
HP offers a standard one-year warranty on all of its LaserJet printers.  Owners of its products can contact HP directly or any of its Authorized Service Providers to fulfill warranty service.  After the first year an extended warranty can be purchased to continue coverage.  As of 2017 the models that are still eligible for on-site warranty service are the following: M402, M506, M604, M605, M606, M607, M608, M609, M712, M806, M426, M521, M525, M527, M630, M631, M632, M633, M725, M830, M452, M451, M551, CP4025, M651, M652, M653, CP5225, M750, M855, M476, M477, M570, M575, M577, M680, M681, M682, M775, M880.

After 7 years has passed since a model has been discontinued, manufacturers are no longer obligated to produce new parts to repair printers.  HP has generally continued to produce parts after this time to continue support for their LaserJet printers, but  there are a number of models for which new parts are no longer available from the original manufacturer:
Mono: 1100, 1150, 1160, 1200, 1300, 1320, 2100, 2300, 3015, 3020, 3030, 3050, 3052, 3055, 3100, 3150, 3200, 3300, 3310, 3320, 3330, 3380, 3390, 4, 4+, 4000, 4050, 4100, 5, 5+, 5si, 5000, 5100, 6, 6L, 6P, 8150, 9000, M1522, M2727; 
Color: 1500, 1600, 2500, 2550, 2600, 2820, 2840, 3500, 3550, 3600, 3700, 3800, 4500, 4550, 4600, 4650, 8500, 8550, 9500, 9550, CM4730, CP3505. Third-party maintenance companies may have limited supplies of parts from their own stocks or from cannibalized equipment, but eventually recommend migrating to newer equipment.

See also

 List of Hewlett-Packard products
 PC LOAD LETTER

References

External links
 HP Virtual museum: LaserJet printer
 Twenty Years of Innovation: HP LaserJet and Inkjet Printers 1984–2004

Computer-related introductions in 1984
 
Products introduced in 1984